Allan Matthew Potts  (25 September 1934 – 8 May 2014) was a New Zealand athlete, athletics coach and administrator. He was the New Zealand 10-mile champion in 1964 and coached his wife, Sylvia, a middle-distance athlete of the 1960s and 1970s. He was the track and field coach for the New Zealand team at the 1992 Olympic Games in Barcelona, and served as president of Athletics New Zealand from 2002 to 2003.

In the 1998 Queen's Birthday Honours, Potts was appointed an Officer of the New Zealand Order of Merit, for services to athletics.

References

1934 births
2014 deaths
Sportspeople from Oamaru
New Zealand male middle-distance runners
New Zealand male long-distance runners
New Zealand athletics coaches
New Zealand sports executives and administrators
Officers of the New Zealand Order of Merit